Minuscule 188 (in the Gregory-Aland numbering), ε 223 (Soden), is a Greek minuscule manuscript of the New Testament, on parchment. Palaeographically it has been assigned to the 12th century. It has marginalia.

Description 

The codex contains a complete text of the four Gospels on 228 thick parchment leaves (size ). The text is written in one column per page, in 25 lines per page (10 by 7 cm), in black and brown ink, the capital letters in red. It is a beautiful manuscript.

There is also a division according to the Ammonian Sections (in Mark 233 Sections; 16:8), with references to the Eusebian Canons (written below Ammonian Section numbers).

Text 

The Greek text of the codex is a representative of the Byzantine text-type. Hermann von Soden included it to the textual family Kx. Aland did not place it in any Category.
According to the Claremont Profile Method it belongs to the textual group M106 in Luke 1, Luke 10, and Luke 20.

History 

The manuscript was examined by Birch, Scholz, and Burgon. C. R. Gregory saw it in 1886.

It is currently housed at the Laurentian Library (Plutei. VI. 25), at Florence.

See also 

 List of New Testament minuscules
 Biblical manuscript
 Textual criticism

References

Further reading 

 

Greek New Testament minuscules
12th-century biblical manuscripts